Eddington station is a SEPTA Regional Rail station in Bensalem Township, Pennsylvania. It is located on Street and Dunksferry Roads, 18.2 miles from 30th Street Station, and serves the Trenton Line. Its name derives from the surrounding CDP of Eddington.

The station is in zone 3 on the SEPTA Trenton Line, on the Amtrak Northeast Corridor. In 2004, this station saw 38 boardings on an average weekday. Amtrak does not stop at this station. Eddington is a local station, with several express trains per day bypassing the station entirely. Of the trains that do stop, the station is almost always a flag stop except at rush hour. It is the only local station on the Trenton Line; all other stations receive consistent service throughout the day, although several are also flag stops. The former Pennsylvania Railroad depot at Eddington was burned down in late September 1956 as part of a suspected arson.

Station layout

References

External links
SEPTA – Eddington Station
Old Eddington PRR Station
 Street Road entrance from Google Maps Street View

SEPTA Regional Rail stations
Former Pennsylvania Railroad stations
Railway stations in Bucks County, Pennsylvania
Stations on the Northeast Corridor